is the seventh single by Japanese idol group STU48, released on October 20, 2021. Yumiko Takino served as lead performer for the title song. The single is the last one featuring Nana Okada, the group's first captain. It topped the Japanese music charts in its release week.

Production and release 
The music video for the title song depicts a glamping trip at the uninhabited Kujira Island in Okayama Prefecture and features the members enjoying activities such as fishing, kayaking, and barbecue. For the campfire scene, Takino wrote an actual letter on the shooting day to read to Okada.

The B-side  is a solo song performed by Yura Ikeda, who took first place at the third AKB48 Group No.1 Singing Ability Contest in December 2020.  is Okada's farewell song, performed by all members.  was performed by the subunit Katte ni! Shikoku Kanko Taishi, and the music video features the appearance of selected fans, who appeared on the backdrop screens via Zoom video conference.

The album was released in three editions, five including Limited Editions.

Setorock contest 
In November, the group announced the Setorock contest, where high school bands from the Setouchi region were invited to send their cover versions of the title song for the chance to serve as backup band at the STU48 Christmas concert and win audio equipment from contest sponsor Yamaha. The group's own rock band subunit, Aoi Himawari, also published their cover version on November 26. The band Crampton from Hiroshima Funairi High School won the contest and performed with the group at the Okayama Civic Hall on December 24, 2021.

Reception 
"Hetaretachi yo" sold about 235,000 copies in its release week according to Billboard Japan and placed first in both the Oricon Singles and Billboard Japan Hot 100 charts.

References

External links 

  

2021 singles
2021 songs
Songs with lyrics by Yasushi Akimoto
King Records (Japan) singles
Oricon Weekly number-one singles
Billboard Japan Hot 100 number-one singles